"The Banner of Freedom", known also as "" ("Samoa, Arise") is the national anthem of Samoa. Both the words (which reference the country's flag) and the music were composed by Sauni Iiga Kuresa. The anthem was composed in response to a public competition to select a new anthem when the United Nations conferred self-government on Samoa in 1948 and was chosen from among 15 entries. It was performed publicly for the first time on 1 June 1948 and was subsequently played at all public ceremonies attended by the High Commissioner and performed after "God Save the Queen" on official occasions. It was retained as the national anthem upon Samoa's gaining of independence from New Zealand in 1962.

The anthem is recognised by the Official Flag and National Anthem of Samoa Act 1994. When it is sung or played in public, people and vehicles must stop and remain stationary until the performance is complete.

Lyrics

Samoan original

English translations

Notes

References

External links
 NationalAnthems.info's page on "The Banner of Freedom" - includes audio recording

Oceanian anthems
Samoan music
National symbols of Samoa
1962 songs
National anthems
National anthem compositions in A-flat major
Samoan-language songs